Three Colours: Blue is a 1993 drama film directed and co-written by Polish filmmaker Krzysztof Kieślowski. It is the first of three films that make up the Three Colours trilogy, themed on the French Revolutionary ideals of liberty, equality, and fraternity, followed by White and Red. According to Kieślowski, the subject of the film is liberty, specifically emotional liberty, rather than its social or political meaning.

Set in Paris, the film follows a woman whose husband and child are killed in a car accident. Suddenly freed from her familial bonds, she tries to isolate herself from everything and live in seclusion from her former ties. However, she discovers that she cannot escape human connections.

Upon its release, Blue received critical acclaim and won several accolades, including the Golden Lion and the Volpi Cup for Best Actress at the Venice Film Festival. It remains one of Kieślowski's most celebrated works.

Plot
Julie, the wife of the famous French composer Patrice de Courcy, loses her husband and daughter in an automobile accident but survives herself. While recovering in the hospital, Julie tries to commit suicide by taking an overdose of pills but is unable to swallow them. After being released from the hospital, Julie, who is thought to have helped write much of her husband's famous pieces, destroys what remains of his work. She contacts Olivier, a collaborator of her husband's who has always admired her, and sleeps with him before bidding him farewell. She empties the family home and puts it up for sale, taking an apartment in Paris near Rue Mouffetard without informing anyone. Her only memento is a mobile of blue beads that is hinted to have belonged to her daughter.

Julie dissociates herself from her past life and distances herself from former friendships. She is no longer recognized by her mother, who suffers from Alzheimer's. She reclaims and destroys the unfinished score for her late husband's last commissioned work, a piece celebrating European unity following the end of the Cold War. Excerpts of its music, however, haunt her throughout the film.

Despite her desire to live anonymously and alone, Julie is soon confronted by her past. A boy who witnessed the accident gives her a cross necklace found at the scene and asks her about her husband's last words, the punchline of an indelicate joke. Julie allows the boy to keep the necklace. Julie also reluctantly befriends Lucille, an exotic dancer who is having an affair with one of her neighbors and is despised by most people in the apartment building. The two women provide emotional support for each other. While comforting Lucille at the club where she works, Julie sees Olivier being interviewed on TV, revealing that he kept a copy of the European piece and plans to finish it himself. Julie then sees a picture of Patrice with another woman.

Julie confronts Olivier about the European piece and asks him about the woman seen with Patrice. She tracks down Sandrine, a lawyer and Patrice's lover, and finds out that she is pregnant with his child. Julie arranges for Sandrine to have the family home, not yet sold, and eventual recognition of his paternity for the child. Julie then returns to working on the piece with Olivier and finishes the final part. She calls Olivier, who refuses to take the piece as his own unless Julie is credited as well, to which Julie agrees. Julie then calls Olivier again and asks him if he still loves her; he says yes, and Julie proceeds to meet him.

In the final sequence, part of the completed Unity of Europe piece is played, which features chorus and a solo soprano singing in Greek the praise of divine love in Saint Paul's first letter to the Corinthians. Images are seen of all the people Julie has affected by her actions. The film ends with a shot of Julie crying before she begins to smile gradually.

Cast
 Juliette Binoche as Julie de Courcy (née Vignon)
 Benoît Régent as Olivier Benôit
 Florence Pernel as Sandrine
 Charlotte Véry as Lucille
 Hélène Vincent as the journalist
 Philippe Volter as the real estate agent
 Emmanuelle Riva as Madame Vignon, Julie's mother
 Yann Trégouët as Antoine
 Julie Delpy as Dominique (cameo)
 Zbigniew Zamachowski as Karol Karol (cameo)

Production
Blue was an international co-production between the French companies CED Productions, Eurimages, France 3 Cinéma, and MK2 Productions, the Swiss company CAB Productions and the Polish company Studio Filmowe TOR.

Like the other films in the trilogy, Blue makes frequent visual allusions to its title: numerous scenes are shot with blue filters or blue lighting, and many objects are blue. When Julie thinks about the musical score that she has tried to destroy, blue light overwhelms the screen. The film also includes several references to the colours of the tricolor that inspired Kieślowski's trilogy: several scenes are dominated by red light, and in one scene, children dressed in white bathing suits with red floaters jump into the blue swimming pool. Another scene features a link with the next film in the trilogy: while spotting the lawyer Sandrine, her husband's mistress, Julie is seen entering a courtroom where Karol, the Polish main character of White, is being divorced by Dominique, his estranged French wife.

Analysis
The occasional fade-outs and fade-ins to Julie's character are used to represent an extremely subjective point of view. According to Kieślowski, "at a certain moment, time really does pass for Julie while at the same time, it stands still. Not only does her music come back to haunt her at a certain point, but time stands still for a moment".

Reception
Three Colours: Blue received widespread acclaim from film critics. On review aggregator Rotten Tomatoes, the film has an approval rating of 98% based on 51 reviews, with an average rating of 8.5/10. The website's critical consensus reads, "Three Colors: Blue contains some of director/co-writer Krzysztof Kieslowski's most visually arresting, emotionally resonant work—and boasts an outstanding performance from Juliette Binoche in the bargain". On Metacritic, another review aggregator, the film has a weighted average score of 85 out of 100, indicating "universal acclaim". Marjorie Baumgarten of The Austin Chronicle wrote:Blue is a film that engages the mind, challenges the senses, implores a resolution, and tells, with aesthetic grace and formal elegance, a good story and a political allegory. Derek Malcolm of The Guardian wrote:Blue remains an intense and moving tribute to the woman at its centre who, in coming back from tragedy, almost refuses, but ultimately accepts the only real love that's on offer.

Year-end lists 
 9th – James Berardinelli, ReelViews

Soundtrack

Awards and recognition
 Venice Film Festival, 1993: Golden Lion, Volpi Cup for Best Actress (Juliette Binoche), Best Cinematography (Sławomir Idziak)
 César Award, 1993: Best Actress (Juliette Binoche), Best Sound, Best Film Editing
 Golden Globe Award: Best Actress - Motion Picture Drama (Juliette Binoche, nominated)
 Golden Globe Award: Best Foreign Language Film (nominated)
 Goya Awards (Spain's Academy Awards): Best European Film
 Guldbagge Awards: Best Foreign Film (nominated)
 Chicago Film Festival, 1993 - Special Jury Prize
 Los Angeles Film Critics Association Awards, 1993 - Best Foreign Language Film (Runner up)
In 2007, the film was ranked at No. 29 by The Guardian's readers poll on the list of "40 greatest foreign films of all time". The film ranked 64th in BBC's 2018 list of The 100 greatest foreign language films.

References

External links

 
 
 
 
 Three Colors: A Hymn to European Cinema an essay by Colin MacCabe at the Criterion Collection
 Blue: Bare Necessities an essay by Nick James at the Criterion Collection

1993 films
1993 drama films
French drama films
1990s French-language films
1990s Polish-language films
Films directed by Krzysztof Kieślowski
Films about grieving
Films about music and musicians
Films about widowhood
Films featuring a Best Actress César Award-winning performance
Films scored by Zbigniew Preisner
Films set in Paris
Films shot in France
Films shot in Paris
Golden Lion winners
Films with screenplays by Krzysztof Piesiewicz
Films with screenplays by Krzysztof Kieślowski
Films about self-harm
Films produced by Marin Karmitz
Films about depression
1993 multilingual films
French multilingual films
Polish multilingual films
Swiss multilingual films
French-language Swiss films
1990s French films
1993 independent films